This article lists the winners and nominees for the Black Reel Award for Outstanding Independent Documentary. This award is given to the directors and was first awarded during the 2010 ceremony.

Winners and nominees
Winners are listed first and highlighted in bold.

2010s

2020s

Multiple nominations and wins

Multiple nominations
 2 Nominations
 Bayer Mack
 Yoruba Richen

References

Black Reel Awards